Tigri  is a village situated in the Deoband Mandal  of Saharanpur District in the state of Uttar Pradesh.

Villages nearby include Fulasi (1.5 km), Gopali (2.0 km), Rajupur (2.1 km), Fulas Akbarpur (2.2 km), Dudhali (2.3 km), Thitki (2.9 km), and Zahirpur (3.3 km).

References 

Villages in Saharanpur district